Richard Helm is one of the "Gang of Four" who wrote the influential Design Patterns book. In 2006 he was awarded the Dahl–Nygaard Prize for his contributions to the state of the art embodied in that book.

References

Living people
Computer scientists
Year of birth missing (living people)